Nemci is a small village in western Slovenia in the Municipality of Nova Gorica. It is located on the high Trnovo Forest Plateau overlooking the Vipava Valley.

References

External links
Nemci on Geopedia

Populated places in the City Municipality of Nova Gorica